William Duncan McNally (July 8, 1882 – June 29, 1961) was the chief chemist in the Cook County Department of Public Health and the chief chemist for the Cook County Medical Examiner's office. He invented an early breathalyzer in 1927.

He was a holder of M.D.

Biography

William Duncan McNally was born on July 8, 1882 in Saginaw, Michigan to Elizabeth and Edward Henry McNally. He graduated from the University of Michigan in 1905.

He married Helen Marie Pierce on September 22, 1906 in Chicago, Illinois. By 1911 he was working as a chemist at Armour and Company in East St. Louis, Illinois.

By 1918 he was the toxicologist for the Cook County Department of Public Health.  He invented an early breathalyzer in 1927.

He died on June 29, 1961 in Mobile, Alabama.

Works
 Medical Jurisprudence and Toxicology (1939)
 Toxicology (1937)

Footnotes

1882 births
1961 deaths
20th-century American chemists
American toxicologists
People from Saginaw, Michigan
University of Michigan alumni
People from Chicago
Breathalyzer
20th-century American inventors